Santorin may refer to:

Santorin (gamer)
Santorín (horse)